Jukka Rousu (born 19 July 1980), better known by his stage name Jukka Poika, is a Finnish reggae artist.

Discography

Albums

Singles

References

External links 

 Jukka Poika on Myspace

Finnish reggae musicians
People from Haukipudas
1980 births
Living people